José María Díaz y Díaz Villaamil (1898–1936) was a Spanish Galician lawyer and politician. He was a member of the Republican Left (Spain) and supporter of the Second Spanish Republic. He served as civil governor of Huesca, Malaga and Zaragoza. After the start of the Spanish Civil War, he was executed by the supporters of Francisco Franco during the White Terror (Spain).

External links
 Biografía en la web de Izquierda Republicana.

1898 births
1936 deaths
Politicians from Galicia (Spain)
20th-century Spanish lawyers
Victims of the White Terror (Spain)
Republican Left (Spain) politicians
20th-century Spanish politicians
Civil governors of Huesca
Civil governors of Málaga
Civil governors of Zaragoza
Members of the Congress of Deputies of the Second Spanish Republic
Lawyers from Galicia (Spain)